Seymour Mountain is a mountain located in Franklin County, New York, named after Horatio Seymour (1810–1886), Governor of New York (1853–1854, 1863–1864). The mountain is part of the Seward Mountains of the Adirondacks. Seymour Mountain faces Seward Mountain to the west across Ouluska Pass.

Seymour Mountain stands within the watershed of the Raquette River, which drains into the Saint Lawrence River in Canada, and into the Gulf of Saint Lawrence.
The east and southeast slopes of Seymour Mtn. drain via various brooks into the Cold River, a tributary of the Raquette River.
The west side of Seymour Mtn. drains into Seward Brook, thence into the Cold River.
The northern slopes of Seymour drain into Ward Brook, thence into Ampersand Lake, Ampersand Brook, Stony Creek, and the Raquette River.

Seymour Mountain is within the High Peaks Wilderness Area of New York's Adirondack Park.

See also 
 List of mountains in New York
 Northeast 111 4,000-footers
 Adirondack High Peaks
 Adirondack Forty-Sixers

Notes

External links 
  46Mountains.com: Seymour Mountain
  Peakbagger.com: Seymour Mountain
  Summitpost.org: Seymour Mountain
 

Mountains of Franklin County, New York
Adirondack High Peaks
Geography of Franklin County, New York